Marripadu is a village in Chittoor district of the Indian state of Andhra Pradesh. It is located in Gurramkonda mandal.

Demographics 

Telugu is the Local Language here. Total population of  Marripadu is 3416. Males are 1747 and  Females are  1,669  living in 762 Houses. Total area of  Marripadu  is 1331 hectares.

Geography
.

References

Villages in Chittoor district